2-Decendioic acid is a chemical compound classified as a fatty acid and a dicarboxylic acid.

2-Decendioic acid is a constituent of honey.  It is present in high concentrations in sugar-fed honey, but only in trace amounts in natural honey. Quantitative evaluation of 2-decenedioic acid in honey has therefore been suggested as a method of detecting adulteration of honey.

Decenedioic acid is a natural product found in the fungus Aspergillus unilateralis.

References

Dicarboxylic acids
Fatty acids